Arazu is the Babylonian god of construction and or crafts. Arazu was created by Ea. With one version saying he was created in order to build and restore temples.

It has been interpreted that Arazu is a priest.

References 

Mesopotamian gods
Crafts gods